The Zschiegner Refining Company (ZRC) was located in Howell, New Jersey, and operated as a metal refining facility. Some of their operations included stripping the chemicals off of precious metals from watch bands, photographic film, and electrical components. In 1992, the United States Environmental Protection Agency (EPA) discovered that 3,000 chemicals had contaminated the soil, surface water, and groundwater. These areas were contaminated due to discharge of waste to the ground surface, the movement of waste and contamination downhill from the site building, along with surface water runoff. When the EPA investigated the site and found the chemicals in the groundwater and soil, they shut down the company that same year in 1992. In that area, the environment and people were affected, especially the workers in the facility. After a Hazard Ranking System report was conducted by the EPA, the site was placed on the National Priorities List in March 1998. In 2008, the cleanup was completed, but groundwater and wetland is still being monitored.

Origins
The Zschiegner Refining Company was located in Howell Township, Monmouth County, New Jersey, United States. Over 50,000 people reside in Howell Township, which is currently governed by Theresa Berger. Started in 1964 by Mr. Herbert Zschiegner, this company was a precious metal refining laboratory that operated stripping the chemicals off of precious metals. The Zschiegner Refining Company was located in a rural area that had surrounding properties and residences, as well as a stream known as Haystack Brook.

Town history
Howell Township is located in Monmouth County, New Jersey, United States. On February 23, 1801, Howell was included as a township by an act of the New Jersey Legislature, from parts of Shrewsbury Township. As time went on, many other townships took portions of Howell to form their own, which included Brick Township, Ocean County, Wall Township and Farmingdale. Howell currently borders townships from two counties, Monmouth County and Ocean County. These townships include Wall Township, Freehold Township and Colts Neck Township, which are located in Monmouth County; and Brick Township, Lakewood Township, and Jackson Township, that are located in Ocean County. With portions of the township being taken away in the past, Howell currently “has a total area of 61.209 square miles (158.530 km2), including 60.558 square miles (156.844 km2) of land and 0.651 square miles (1.686 km2) of water (1.06%),” according to the United States Census Bureau. The 2010 United States Census also states that there are 51,075 people, 17,260 households, and 13,618 families living in Howell.

The current mayor of Howell Township is Theresa Berger, but the name of this township originated from Richard Howell, who served as the third Governor of New Jersey from 1794 to 1801. One interesting fact about Howell is that it is considered a “doughnut town,” where one town entirely wraps another town, due to the fact that it completely surrounds Farmingdale.

Company history
The Zschiegner Refining Company (ZRC) was founded in 1964 by Mr. Herbert Zschiegner. This precious metals refining facility is located on a 6.1-acre site in a rural residential area. There are many properties and residences that are located near the ZRC site. There are homes nearby, one being 100 feet away, two located 100 yards. All of these homes collect their water from a private well. This private well serves approximately 48,000 people, including the Zschiegner Refining Company, and is located 6.5 miles from the site. On the eastern section of the property, a stream called the Haystack Brook is located, where a pond adjacent to it, is located southeast of the property. Located west of the property is Maxim-Southard Road and the Candlewood residential development. In the surrounding area are many populated developments since it is rural. Due to the fact that the EPA found chemicals on their site, operations of this company ended in 1992.

Superfund designation
In October 1992, the Zschiegner Refining Company was raided by the US Drug Enforcement Administration (DEA) due to suspicions that the site were manufacturing illegal drugs. From this raid, the DEA not only discovered methamphetamine, but 3,000 different chemicals on site, which caught the attention of the EPA.

State intervention
On October 31, 1992, the DEA conducted a drug raid at the Zschiegner Refining Company. The DEA initially conducted this raid due to suspicions that the ZRC were manufacturing illegal drugs. Not only did the DEA find that the company was manufacturing methamphetamine, but they also found approximately 3,000 different chemicals including peroxides, cyanides, caustics, and acids improperly stored at the facility.

As a result, to this discovery, owner/operator Herbert Zschiegner was arrested for the illegal manufacture of methamphetamine. Being arrested was not the only punishment that Zschiegner was given. Since he was violating the Clean Water Act, he was criminally convicted on three counts in 1995. Zschiegner was also ordered to serve a 16-month prison term and had to pay $650,000 in restitution to the EPA. Due to the raid conducted on Zschiegner’s company, it caught the attention of the local and state environmental regulatory agencies.

National intervention
After the Zschiegner Refining Company was raided by the DEA, where approximately 3,000 different chemicals were discovered, the EPA decided to investigate the site further. On November 2, 1992, the EPA started removing all the chemicals and any materials that were contaminated. The EPA also took several samples and in 1995, the analysis of these samples showed that inorganic contaminants were found in the on-site soil and downstream surface water and sediment. In December 1997, a Hazard Ranking System (HRS) report was made, which concluded by placing the site on the National Priorities List (NPL) in March 1998.

In order for a site to be considered a “Superfund site,” the EPA must collect data and determine if there are any hazardous chemicals affecting the environment. The test the EPA conducts is called the HRS, which is “a numerically based screening system that uses information from initial limited investigations to assess the relative potential of sites to pose a threat to human health or the environment.” This test was created to see if there are any potential threats on human health or the environment. If a site did meet their criteria then it is placed into the NPL, which is where we can see how the Zschiegner Refining Company site was placed.

Health and environmental hazards
After the DEA discovered approximately 3,000 chemicals on site, the EPA decided to investigate. This investigation was through sampling and as a result, the EPA discovered several chemicals. These chemicals were hazardous and affected the people and environment in the area that it was found in. The soil, sediments, surface water, groundwater, and the building were all contaminated with these hazardous chemicals. The people that worked at the facility were getting sick and were experiencing symptoms, such as irritation to different parts of their bodies.

Etha
One chemical that was initially found in the first assessment was Etha (Ethyl, Ether, or Ethyl). Etha is a colorless, liquid that can easily be evaporated. This chemical is exposed by inhaling it or can be absorbed through the skin. With just a little bit of exposure, it can cause narcotic effects such as sleepiness or giddiness, eye irritation, irritation of skin, or respiratory system.

Sodium peroxide
Another chemical that was found was sodium peroxide. This is a yellow, white powder that is odorless, and one can get exposed to this chemical by inhaling this powder. Another way to get exposed by this chemical is simply by contact with the skin and eyes. When exposed, some symptoms include irritation, as well as chemical burns on the eyes, skin, and mucous membranes.

Sodium hydroxide
Sodium Hydroxide is also another chemical that was found. This chemical has no odor, but it is a white, solid. In order to be exposed, one would have to inhale it, absorb it through the skin, ingest it, or have contact with the eyes or skin. This chemical could scar the eyes, nose or throat and could cause irritation. Sodium Hydroxide could also can be very destructive to tissues.

Chromic acid
Adding to the list, chromic acid was also another chemical found on the site. Unlike the properties of the other chemicals, this chemical is a dark, red liquid. To be exposed to this chemical, one would have to inhale it, ingest it, absorb it through the skin, or through contact with the eyes or skin. Some symptoms that can occur through exposure include eyes and nose irritation as well as to the respiratory system. Dermatitis, or eczema, can also be a symptom that can result from exposure of Chromic Acid.

Cleanup
After being evaluated by the EPA, approximately 3,000 different chemicals were discovered throughout the Zschiegner Refining site. The EPA immediately “removed approximately 2,000 gallons of acidic solutions, 1,600 gallons of basic solutions, and 1,400 small containers of hazardous substances.” Contamination was found in the soil, sediments, surface water, groundwater, and in the building by the EPA. The site has completed its site since 2008, yet groundwater and wetland is still being monitored.

Initial cleanup
November 2, 1992 was when the United States Environmental Protection Agency (USEPA) made an evaluation of Zschiegner Refining. After the evaluation, “a verbal authorization of funds was approved at this time to remove dangers present on the Zschiegner Refining Site. The Technical Assistance Team (TAT) conducted a site assessment on November 4, 1992. The work to be conducted at Zschiegner Refining is to stabilize, treat and remove all hazardous materials, drums and laboratory chemicals contained at Zschiegner Refining.” It was the EPA’s mission to try to get rid of all the hazardous chemicals that was found on the site and they wanted to do so as quick as possible. Due to their findings, the EPA transferred contaminated materials to new containers, soil and liquid were taken to be sampled and explosive items were detonated.

In March 1993, the removal action started and the chemical wastes were taken away. Inorganic contaminants were found in soil, surface water and sediment from sampling in 1995. In July 1998, no contaminants were discovered as the EPA tested the private well water downstream from the site for organic and inorganic contaminants. The EPA selected a remedy in the site’s September 2004 Record of Decision, or ROD, and called for “excavation of contaminated surface and subsurface soil; excavation of contaminated sediment from the wetland and a small portion of the brook next to the site; transportation of contaminated soil and sediment off site for disposal, with treatment if necessary; demolition of the on-site building to allow for excavation of contaminated soil beneath it; and groundwater monitoring.” These orders ultimately led to the current status of the Zschiegner Refining site.

Current status
The cleanup for the Zschiegner Refining site has been completed since 2008. In February 2007, the company’s building was demolished and discarded from the site. As the EPA were cleaning this site, “a total of 10,425 cubic yards of contaminated upland soil and 15,351 cubic yards of contaminated wetland soil was excavated and disposed of.” This amount of contamination demonstrates how hazardous the Zschiegner Refining Company was to its surroundings. Although all the chemicals have been removed, the groundwater and wetland is still being monitored in order to make sure that it is safe for the people and the environment.

References

External links
 
 
 

Superfund sites in New Jersey
Howell Township, New Jersey